The Doctor is a 2013 film documenting the life of former American Basketball Association (ABA) and National Basketball Association (NBA) player and Hall of Fame inductee Julius Erving. It premiered on NBA TV on June 10, 2013.

References

NBA Entertainment films
Documentary films about African Americans
Documentary films about sportspeople
Documentary films about basketball
2013 films